The Logitech FreePulse Wireless Headphones are headphones that use Bluetooth to transmit audio from the receiver to the headphones. The receiver can use a 3.5 mm headphone jack to plug into most audio outputs. The headphones emit sound from up to 10 metres (33 ft) away from the receiver using Bluetooth 2.0 with Enhanced Data Rate (EDR) wireless technology. It is also compatible with most music players but can also be connected via an external Bluetooth source.

External links
Logitech.com
 Difference Between Hi-Fi and Studio Headphones

Headphones
Logitech products